Argyrotaenia sagata is a species of moth of the family Tortricidae. It is found in Brazil in the states of Minas Gerais and Rio de Janeiro.

References

Moths described in 2000
sagata
Moths of South America